The Wujal Wujal Aboriginal Shire is a local government area in Far North Queensland, Australia. It is managed as a Deed of Grant in Trust under the Local Government (Community Government Areas) Act 2004.

Geography
It is on the east coast of the Cape York Peninsula excised from the Shire of Douglas and consists of a single locality, Wujal Wujal which is split into two disjoint areas separated by the Bloomfield River (the river itself remaining part of Shire of Douglas).

History 
Kuku Yalanji  (also known as Gugu Yalanji, Kuku Yalaja, and Kuku Yelandji) is an Australian Aboriginal language of the Mossman and Daintree areas of  North Queensland. The language region includes areas within the local government area of Shire of Douglas and Shire of Cook, particularly the localities of Mossman, Daintree, Bloomfield River, China Camp, Maytown, Palmer, Cape Tribulation and Wujal Wujal.

Yalanji  (also known as Kuku Yalanji, Kuku Yalaja, Kuku Yelandji, and Gugu Yalanji) is an Australian Aboriginal language of Far North Queensland. The traditional language region is Mossman River in the south to the Annan River in the north, bordered by the Pacific Ocean in the east and extending inland to west of Mount Mulgrave. This includes the local government boundaries of the Shire of Douglas, the Shire of Cook and the Aboriginal Shire of Wujal Wujal and the towns and localities of Cooktown,  Mossman, Daintree, Cape Tribulation and Wujal Wujal. It includes the head of the Palmer River, the Bloomfield River, China Camp, Maytown, and Palmerville.

Amenities 
The Wujal Wujal Aboriginal Shire Council operate the Wujal Wujal Indigenous Knowledge Centre at Wujal Wujal.

List of mayors 

 2020–present: Bradley Travis Shane Creek

References

Local government areas of Queensland